I Can Only Imagine may refer to:

 "I Can Only Imagine" (MercyMe song), the 2001 song
 "I Can Only Imagine" (David Guetta song), a 2012 song
 I Can Only Imagine (film), a 2018 film based on the MercyMe song
 "I Can Only Imagine", a song by Poco from Running Horse